"No sé" is a song by Spanish singer Melody. This was a single from her third album T.Q.M.. She released it in 2003, at the age of 12.

Track listing

Charts

Year-end charts

DJ Pana version

In 2013, Venezuelan singer and actor DJ Pana released a new version of the song featuring Melody. This version was recorded in Meregue style and included a music video which was shot in Spain.

Explosión De Iquitos version

In 2021, Peruvian cumbia group Explosión de Iquitos released a Cumbia version of the song. This version instantly became viral on digital platforms like TikTok becoming very successful in Perú. A music video for the song was filmed in the city of Iquitos in the Amazonian jungle released on April 17, 2021 featuring TikToker Ingeniero Bailarín who's viralized video of him dancing to the song made it popular on the social network. Their version topped the charts in Perú. Melody confirmed that she was going to record a remix of this version along with Explosión de Iquitos. The remix was recorded by June 2021 and released on July 31, 2021 along with its music video which was recorded in Iquitos.

Charts

Year-end charts

Awards and nominations
The song won Hit of the Year at the Premios Luces 2021.

References 

2003 songs
2003 singles
Melody (Spanish singer) songs
Sony Music singles
2013 singles
2021 singles